Wenzhou (526) is a Type 054 frigate of the People's Liberation Army Navy. She was commissioned on 26 September 2005.

Development and design 

The Type 054 has a stealthy hull design with sloped surfaces, radar absorbent materials, and a reduced superstructure clutter.

The main anti-ship armament were YJ-83 sea-skimming anti-ship cruise missiles in two four-cell launchers. It retained the HQ-7 SAM, an improved version of the French Crotale, from the preceding Type 053H3; the HQ-7 had a ready-to-fire 8-cell launcher, with 16 stored in the automatic reloader. Short range defence was improved with four AK-630 CIWS turrets. A 100 mm main gun, also based on a French design, was mounted.

Construction and career 
Wenzhou was launched in November 2003 at the China State Shipbuilding Corporation in Shanghai. Commissioned on 26 September 2005.

On January 1, 2013, several PLA Navy East China Sea Fleet ships, including the Wenzhou and Ma'anshan, conducted offensive and defensive exercises in a certain sea area. On February 5, the Japanese government protested to China, claiming that Wenzhou used fire control radar to target and warn the Japanese Maritime Self-Defense Force's carrier-borne helicopter on January 19. In late June 2013, Wenzhou and Fuzhou were formed into small-scale combat operations, and in the form of shift duty, a real-force confrontation exercise in a complex electromagnetic environment was carried out in a certain sea area. In mid-September 2013, Wenzhou went to a certain sea area to perform combat readiness patrol missions, patrolling offshore derricks, and conducted training in non-war military operations such as temporary seizures, tracking and surveillance.

References 

2003 ships
Ships built in China
Type 054 frigates